Khaled Abdulla Al Qubaisi (born 22 December 1975 in Abu Dhabi) is an Emirati businessman and racing driver who is the Chief Executive Officer of Real Estate & Infrastructure Investments at Mubadala Investment Company. In his role at Mubadala, Al Qubaisi has oversight over a portfolio of both physical and digital assets around the globe, which includes properties, real estate, and the consolidation of Mubadala’s international infrastructure that offer long-term stable returns across business cycles.

Al Qubaisi is also member of the Investment Committee at Mubadala, which is mandated to develop the organization’s investment policies and guidelines, and to review all proposed projects and investments to ensure they are aligned with Mubadala’s business objectives.

Education

Al Qubaisi holds a Master of Science in Project Management (MSPM) degree from the George Washington University, and a bachelor’s degree in finance and operations management from Boston University. He was also awarded the CFA in 2003.

Career 

Before taking over his role as the Chief Executive Officer of Mubadala’s Real Estate & Infrastructure Investments platform in 2021, Al Qubaisi also served as the Chief Executive Officer of Aerospace, Renewables, and ICT where he oversaw the company’s Aerospace, Renewables, Information Communications Technology, Utilities and Defense Services portfolios. Prior to this role, he also served as Chief Human Capital Officer at Mubadala, with responsibility for performance management, learning and development, employee career growth, talent acquisition and Emiratization.

Before joining Mubadala, Al Qubaisi was the Chief Investment Officer at International Capital, where he managed a diverse investment portfolio, and the execution of large-scale, multi-billion Dirham real estate projects. He was also the Head of Corporate Finance & Business Development at the National Bank of Abu Dhabi, where he focused on developing the bank’s investment banking capabilities.

Institutional oversight

Al Qubaisi is the Chairman of the National Central Cooling Company (Tabreed). He is also the Director and Vice Chairman of Abu Dhabi Motor Sports Management and Finance House and sits on the boards of Abu Dhabi Future Energy Company (Masdar), Emirates Nuclear Energy Corporation (ENEC), Emirates Integrated Telecommunications Company (du), GLOBALFOUNDRIES, Mubadala Petroleum and Insurance House. He is also a member of CFA Institute.

Motorsport

Al Qubaisi has been active in the international grand touring races since the beginning of the 2010s. His biggest accomplishments were overall victories at 2012 and 2013 Dubai 24 Hour; each driven out in Black Falcon - Mercedes-Benz SLS AMG GT3 and teammates Sean Edwards, Jeroen Bleekemolen and Thomas Jäger (2012) and Bernd Schneider (2013). In 2013, he also won the Yas Marina 12-Hour Race. He also raced three times in 24 Hours of Le Mans, with his best finish in 2014 when he finished 19th in the overall standings.

Personal life

Al Qubaisi is married and has three children, two daughters, Amna and Hamda, who are also racing drivers, and a son.

Racing record

Career summary

† As Al Qubaisi was a guest driver, he was ineligible to score points.
* Season still in progress.

Complete Formula Regional Asian Championship results
(key) (Races in bold indicate pole position) (Races in italics indicate the fastest lap of top ten finishers)

References

External links
 

1975 births
Living people
Emirati racing drivers
24 Hours of Le Mans drivers
FIA World Endurance Championship drivers
24H Series drivers
F3 Asian Championship drivers
Formula Regional Asian Championship drivers
Porsche Supercup drivers
Prema Powerteam drivers
Porsche Carrera Cup Germany drivers